Geoff Crudgington (born 14 February 1952) is an English former professional footballer who made 633 appearances in the Football League playing as a goalkeeper for Aston Villa, Bradford City, Toronto Metros, Crewe Alexandra, Swansea City and Plymouth Argyle. He went on to become Football in the Community officer and goalkeeping coach at Plymouth Argyle. Crudgington served as the club's Chief Scout from May 2010 until January 2011 when, as a result of the club's financial difficulties, he left the club by mutual consent.

References

 Playfair Football Annuals 1971-72 to 1988-89

1952 births
Living people
Footballers from Wolverhampton
English footballers
English expatriate footballers
English Football League players
North American Soccer League (1968–1984) players
Wolverhampton Wanderers F.C. players
Aston Villa F.C. players
Bradford City A.F.C. players
Toronto Blizzard (1971–1984) players
Crewe Alexandra F.C. players
Swansea City A.F.C. players
Plymouth Argyle F.C. players
Plymouth Argyle F.C. non-playing staff
Association football goalkeepers
Expatriate soccer players in Canada
English expatriate sportspeople in Canada